The men's road race at the 1961 UCI Road World Championships was the 28th edition of the event. The race took place on Sunday 3 September 1961 in Bern, Switzerland. The race was won by Rik Van Looy of Belgium.

Final classification

References

Men's Road Race
UCI Road World Championships – Men's road race
1961 Super Prestige Pernod